Liberty Bible Academy is a private Christian school located in the Mason, Ohio area. Its campus is located in Deerfield Township, just off Mason-Montgomery Road across from the Procter and Gamble Research facility and Deerfield Township Shopping Center;

LBA is a non-denominational school, not affiliated with a particular church or religious group, though its religious teachings is based in Protestant theology.

History

Overview
The school was founded in 1984 by Dean and Ona Truesdale. After leasing facilities for its early years, Liberty Bible Academy moved to its new home in Mason/Deerfield Township in the summer of 1999.  It is a member of the Association of Christian Schools International and is chartered by the Ohio Department of Education.

Academics
Teaching are in a Christ-centered environment. 
The school aims to complement and support both the home and church. LBA graduates excel in high school and college and ultimately fill responsible positions as they make significant contributions to the society in which we live.
All students are involved with Chapel services throughout the week and are required to take Bible class.

Fine arts
General Music instruction is offered to all grade levels within the school as part of the regular curriculum. Each class is introduced to academic and skill development while being exposed to various types of music.
Private piano instruction for all students are offered with lesson times given both during and after school hours.
Band is offered for all students 5–8.
Art is taught weekly to all students PK–8 which introduces new art concepts, tools and techniques. Students receive recognition at the annual ACSI Art Festival.

Activities
Students are given the opportunity to participate in a wide range of Activities such as Men's Basketball, Women's Basketball, Women's Volleyball, Jazz Band, worship band, band, and Art.

References

External links
Liberty Bible Academy official web site

Christian schools in Ohio
Nondenominational Christian schools in the United States
Private schools in Ohio
Educational institutions established in 1984
Buildings and structures in Warren County, Ohio
Education in Warren County, Ohio
1984 establishments in Ohio